Lysichiton camtschatcensis, common name Asian skunk cabbage, white skunk cabbage, Far Eastern swamp lantern or Japanese swamp lantern, is a plant found in swamps and wet woods, along streams and in other wet areas of the Kamchatka Peninsula, the Kuril Islands, Sakhalin and northern Japan. The common name "skunk cabbage" is used for the genus Lysichiton, which includes L. americanus, the western skunk cabbage, noted for its unpleasant smell. The Asian skunk cabbage is more variable: plants have been reported in different cases to smell disgusting, not at all, and sweet. In Japanese it is known as mizubashō (lit. "water-banana") from a supposed similarity to the Japanese banana, a name with poetic rather than malodorous associations. It is not closely related to the true cabbage.

Description

Cultivation
Like its close relative, L. americanus, it is used as a marginal aquatic plant in gardens in Great Britain and Ireland. It has gained the Royal Horticultural Society's Award of Garden Merit.

Hybrids between L. camschatcensis and L. americanus, called Lysichiton × hortensis, are also cultivated. These have larger spathes than either of the parents.

See also
Western skunk cabbage (Lysichiton americanus ): A related plant (in the same genus) from North America, which is known for producing a foul smell
Eastern skunk cabbage (Symplocarpus foetidus), of the same subfamily, from North America, also known for its foul smell, and often confused with the western skunk cabbage

References

Orontioideae
Flora of Russia
Flora of Japan
Plants described in 1753
Taxa named by Carl Linnaeus